Pingguoyuan Subdistrict is a subdistrict on the center of Shijingshan District, Beijing, China. It borders Sijiqing Township in its northeast, Bajiao and Gucheng Subdistricts in its south, as well as Jindingjie and Wulituo Subdistricts in its west. It is home to 97,543 residents as of 2020.

The subdistrict was named Pingguoyuan for an orchard that used to exist in the area.

History 
Pingguoyuan Subdistrict was first organized in 1954. In 1958 it was changed to a production team, and changed back to a subdistrict in 1963.

Administrative Divisions 
In the year 2021, Pingguoyuan Subdistrict oversaw the following 15 communities:

See also 
 List of township-level divisions of Beijing

References 

Shijingshan District
Subdistricts of Beijing